Galactic Energy is a Chinese private space launch enterprise flying the Ceres-1 and developing the Pallas-1 and 2 orbital rockets. The company's long-term objective is to mine asteroids for rare metals and minerals.

History
Galactic Energy successfully conducted its first launch in November 2020 with a Ceres-1 rocket. Galactic Energy became the second private company in China to put a satellite in orbit successfully (after i-Space) and the fourth to attempt an orbital launch (after Landspace, OneSpace, and i-Space).

On 6 December 2021, Galactic Energy launched its second Ceres-1 rocket, becoming the first Chinese private firm to reach orbit twice. In January 2022, the company raised $200 million for reusable launch vehicle development.

Ceres-1
Ceres-1 is a four-stage rocket, the first three stages use solid-propellant rocket motors and the final stage uses a hydrazine propulsion system.

The first launch of Ceres-1 took place at 7 November 2020, successfully placing the Tianqi 11 (also transcribed Tiange, also known as TQ 11, and Scorpio 1, COSPAR 2020-080A) satellite in orbit.

Pallas-1 and 2 

The Pallas-1 is a medium-lift orbital launch vehicle under development by the company. The first stage will have legs and grid fins to allow recovery by vertical landing (much like the SpaceX Falcon 9). The first launch is scheduled to take place in 2024.

Pallas-1 is planned to be capable of placing a 5-tonne payload into low Earth orbit (LEO), or a 3-tonne payload into a 700-kilometer sun-synchronous orbit (SSO). An upgraded variant of the rocket, Pallas-2, is currently under development. Using three Pallas-1 booster cores as its first stage, Pallas-2 will be capable of putting a 14-tonne payload into low Earth orbit.

Marketplace 
Galactic Space is in competition with several other Chinese space rocket startups, being LandSpace, LinkSpace, ExPace, i-Space, OneSpace and Deep Blue Aerospace.

Launches

References

External links 
 

Aerospace companies of China
Space launch vehicles of China
Private spaceflight companies
Commercial spaceflight
Commercial launch service providers